Daddy, Come Home is a song written by Irving Berlin and first published in 1913. The humorous song begins "Hello Central, dear Central, listen here: please connect me with my father" and tells the story from the point of view of a young boy calling his father on the telephone to ask him to leave work and deal with an assortment of family problems at home.

The song was recorded on December 13, 1913, by Billy Murray for The Victor Talking Machine Company (No. 14167).

References

Songs written by Irving Berlin
1913 songs
Billy Murray (singer) songs
Songs about telephone calls
Songs about fathers
Comedy songs